The Grinch (also known as Dr. Seuss' The Grinch) is a 2018 American computer-animated Christmas fantasy comedy film produced by Illumination and distributed by Universal Pictures. Based on the 1957 book How the Grinch Stole Christmas! by Dr. Seuss, it is the third screen adaptation of the story, following the 1966 television special starring Boris Karloff and the 2000 live-action feature-length film starring Jim Carrey. It marks Illumination's second Dr. Seuss film adaptation, following The Lorax (2012). The film was directed by Scott Mosier and Yarrow Cheney (in the former's feature directorial debut) and produced by Chris Meledandri and Janet Healy, with a screenplay written by Michael LeSieur and Tommy Swerdlow. The film stars the voices of Benedict Cumberbatch, Rashida Jones, Kenan Thompson, Angela Lansbury (in her last voice acting role before her death in 2022), and narration by Pharrell Williams. The plot follows the Grinch and his pet dog Max as they plan to stop Whoville's Christmas celebration by stealing all the town's decorations and gifts.

The Grinch was released and distributed by Universal Pictures in the United States on November 9, 2018. It grossed over $526 million worldwide, becoming the highest-grossing Christmas film of all time, as well as the highest-grossing Dr. Seuss film adaptation. It received mixed reviews from critics, who praised the animation and the vocal performances (particularly from Cumberbatch), but criticised the lack of creative license. This was the final Dr. Seuss film adaptation released during the lifetime of Seuss's widow Audrey Geisel, who served as executive producer of the film and died on December 19, 2018, five weeks after the film's release.

Plot

In the town of Whoville, the human-like people called Whos are filled with excitement about celebrating Christmas. However, the only one who is not amused is the grumpy, cantankerous and green-furred Grinch, born with a heart being "two-sizes too small". He lives in his cave with his dog, Max, and only goes into Whoville to buy groceries and harass the Whos.

Meanwhile, 6-year-old Cindy Lou Who notices her mother Donna is overworked trying to take care of herself and her twin infant brothers, Buster and Bean. Cindy Lou initially decides to send a letter to Santa Claus to help her mother, but after an encounter with the Grinch — who sarcastically tells her that, if the matter is so urgent, she will have to talk to Santa face-to-face about it — she decides to go to the North Pole to talk to Santa himself. When Donna tells her that a round trip to the North Pole would take a month, she instead decides to try trapping Santa with the help of her friends.

With Christmas approaching, an attempt by the Grinch to ruin a tree-lighting ceremony goes wrong, resulting in him having a flashback about his disjointed childhood spent alone and unwanted in an orphanage. The Grinch soon decides that he will steal Christmas from Whoville to assuage his distress. He and Max acquire a fat reindeer, whom the Grinch calls Fred, and steal a sleigh from his neighbor Bricklebaum. After a test run, the Grinch and Max discover that Fred has a family, and the Grinch emotionally agrees to let Fred go home with them.

On Christmas Eve, after making a Santa Claus disguise and crafting dozens of gadgets to help him with his plan, the Grinch and Max, who pulls the sleigh in Fred's place, go down to Whoville to steal the decorations and presents. He soon encounters Cindy Lou after falling into her trap. Her request to help lighten her mother's workload and her advice about listening to the Whos' singing to alleviate his sadness touches the Grinch's heart. Despite this, the Grinch continues his mission, unable to let go of the loneliness Christmas brought him.

After stealing every Christmas present and decoration, the Grinch and Max head back to Mount Crumpit to dispose of them. The Whos wake up and are shocked and disappointed to see that the presents and decorations are gone. Cindy Lou believes that she is to blame because of her trap, but Donna tells her that Christmas is not centered on presents and that Cindy Lou is the best thing that ever happened to her. The Whos join together to sing "Welcome Christmas", rendering the Grinch puzzled to see that they are celebrating Christmas despite his thefts. Seeing Cindy Lou and remembering her guidance, he immerses himself in their singing, causing his shrunken heart to blissfully triple in size.

Afterwards, the sleigh begins to fall off Mount Crumpit, and the Grinch attempts to save it. He succeeds when Fred and his family come to his aid. After securing the sleigh, the Grinch and Max slide down back to Whoville in order to return the stolen items, and the remorseful Grinch admits his actions and apologizes to the Whos before returning to his cave.

Feeling sorry for the Grinch, Cindy Lou later invites him and Max to celebrate Christmas at her house which he awkwardly attends. When seated for dinner, he realizes that it was not really Christmas he despised, but being alone and his bitterness over being neglected. With this, the Grinch finally accepts the Whos' friendship and enjoys Christmas with them giving a toast.

Voice cast
 Benedict Cumberbatch as the Grinch, a grumpy, cave-dwelling, green-furred creature who hates Christmas
 Cameron Seely as Cindy Lou Who, a kind-hearted young resident of Whoville
 Rashida Jones as Donna Who, Cindy Lou's overworked single mother
 Kenan Thompson as Bricklebaum, a jolly citizen of Whoville who lives near The Grinch
 Angela Lansbury as Mayor McGerkle, the Mayor of Whoville who oversees the tree-lighting ceremony
 Pharrell Williams as the Narrator
 Tristan O'Hare as Groopert, Cindy Lou's best friend
 Sam Lavagnino as Ozzy, one of Cindy Lou's friends
 Ramone Hamilton as Axl, one of Cindy Lou's friends
 Scarlett Estevez as Izzy, one of Cindy Lou's friends whose mouth is mostly wrapped up in a scarf
 Michael Beattie as a store clerk

Georgia Toffolo provided the voice of Mrs. Toffee Apple (a customer who was trying to reach a jar of "Christmas chutney") in one scene in some releases. In addition, Bill Farmer voices Sam, a bus driver.
 
A recording of Pentatonix' "God Rest You Merry, Gentlemen" was used for the Who-Carolers that stalk the Grinch.

Production

Development
In February 2013, Illumination was developing a 3D animated feature film based on the Dr. Seuss book, with the working title How the Grinch Stole Christmas, later shortened to The Grinch. Peter Candeland and Yarrow Cheney were set to direct, though in 2018 producer Scott Mosier took over from Candeland. Candeland still stayed on the project for additional story direction.

Casting
Benedict Cumberbatch was cast as the titular character in April 2016. Illumination originally wanted Cumberbatch to voice the Grinch in his natural accent, but Cumberbatch felt that since the rest of the cast is American, the Grinch himself should have an American accent. By September 2018, Angela Lansbury had been set to voice the Mayor of Whoville. Rashida Jones, Cameron Seely, and Kenan Thompson also joined the cast, while Pharrell Williams, who had previously worked on Illumination's Despicable Me films, was revealed to be narrating the film.

Animation
The animation was created by Illumination Mac Guff in Paris, France. Several software programs were used in creating the film's CGI characters including Maya, ZBrush, and Nuke as well as in-house software. A 3D CGI model of the town of Whoville through which a virtual camera could travel was crafted using Maya, ZBrush, Foundry's Mari, and Allegorithmic's Substance Painter.

Music

Danny Elfman composed the film's score. Tyler, the Creator wrote a new song for the film titled "I Am the Grinch". Tyler and Danny Elfman, who composed the film's score, collaborated on a new version of the song "You're a Mean One, Mr. Grinch" for the film, which was featured in the final trailer, and early on in the film itself. The score and soundtrack albums were released (both digitally and on CD) and the film.

Release

Theatrical
The film was originally scheduled to be released on November 10, 2017, but on June 7, 2016, it was pushed back to November 9, 2018.

Marketing
Beginning in October, various billboards appeared for the film, each featuring an image of the Grinch, accompanied by a mean or ironic message. Universal and Illumination partnered with several companies to promote the film, including Wonderful Pistachios, Ebates, IHOP and 23andme for about $80 million worth of advertising. All-in-all the studio spent an estimated $121 million promoting the film worldwide. To promote the film, a giant inflatable balloon featuring the titular character first appeared at the 91st Macy's Thanksgiving Day Parade in New York City on November 23, 2017, 1 year ahead of its release. Later in December 2018, The Grinch and Max also made cameos in that year's WNBC/WNJU holiday sing along promo.

Home media
The film was released on Digital HD on January 22, 2019, and on DVD, Blu-ray, Blu-ray 3D, and 4K Ultra HD Blu-ray on February 5. It includes three mini-movies: Yellow is the New Black (which preceded the film in its theatrical run), The Dog Days of Winter, and Santa's Little Helpers. The Dog Days of Winter was first shown on NBC on November 23, 2018, after How the Grinch Stole Christmas! (1966) and before Trolls Holiday.

Television

The film made its broadcast television premiere on FX on December 12, 2020; it later premiered on Disney Channel on December 13, and on Freeform on December 18. The film aired on NBC on December 22, 2021.

Reception

Box office
The Grinch grossed $271.4 million in the United States and Canada, and $255.4 million in other countries, for a total worldwide gross of $527.8 million, against a production budget of $75 million. Deadline Hollywood calculated the film's net profit as $184.6 million, accounting for production budgets, marketing, talent participations, and other costs; box office grosses and home media revenues placed it ninth on their list of 2018's "Most Valuable Blockbusters". It was Universal's second best-performing film of 2018 behind Jurassic World: Fallen Kingdom.

In the United States and Canada, The Grinch was released alongside The Girl in the Spider's Web and Overlord, and was projected to gross $55–65 million from 4,140 theaters in its opening weekend. It made $18.7 million on its first day, including $2.2 million from Thursday night previews, more than the $1.7 million taken in by Illumination's Sing in 2016. It went on to debut to $67.6 million, finishing first at the box office and topping the 2000 film's $55 million opening. In its second weekend the film made $38.2 million, finishing second behind newcomer Fantastic Beasts: The Crimes of Grindelwald. In its third weekend the film made $30.2 million (including $42 million over the five-day Thanksgiving period), finishing fourth. In its fourth and fifth weekends, the film finished second behind Ralph Breaks the Internet, grossing $17.9 million and $15.0 million, respectively. It marked the first-ever time animated films were the top two films at the box office in back-to-back weekends.

Critical response
The website's critical consensus reads, "The Grinch gives the classic Seuss source material a brightly animated update that's solidly suitable for younger viewers without adding substantially to the story's legacy." On Metacritic, the film has a weighted average score of 51 out of 100, based on 32 critics, indicating "mixed or average reviews". Audiences polled by CinemaScore gave the film an average grade of "A−" on an A+ to F scale, while PostTrak reported filmgoers gave it an 83% positive score and a 75% "definite recommend".

Alonso Duralde of TheWrap gave the film a positive review, calling it "full of warmth and wit" and writing, "Purists may balk about revisiting this tale, but The Grinch earns its laughter and its sentiment, both of which are plentiful. It's a full-throated Fah-Who-Foraze." Owen Gleiberman of Variety compared the film favorably to the 2000 live-action version, writing, "For anyone who grew up with How the Grinch Stole Christmas, The Grinch won’t replace it, yet it's nimble and affectionate in a way that can hook today's children, and more than a few adults, by conjuring a feeling that comes close enough. By the end, your own heart will swell, though maybe just one or two sizes."

Glenn Kenny of The New York Times wrote, "Said dog, Max is the most charming character in this version, directed by Scott Mosier and Yarrow Cheney. The filmmakers keep the visuals merry and popping bright. Benedict Cumberbatch, voicing the Grinch, opts not to compete with Karloff at all, which is smart and speaks in an American accent, sounding rather like Bill Hader, which is confusing. A tepid hip-hop song about the Grinch plays over the end credits. It’s by Tyler, the Creator, who only a few years ago was considered one of the saltiest (to put it mildly) voices in music. Here, his contribution is as toothless as the rest of the movie." Molly Freeman of Screen Rant gave the film a 3 out of 5 stars, saying "The Grinch may not be a necessary holiday movie, but fans of Dr. Seuss's story or holiday films, in general, will find plenty to like in this new animated retelling. Plus, with a variety of family-friendly jokes, The Grinch will no doubt entertain viewers young and old, though the 90-minute runtime does stretch thin in the third act of the movie. It's perhaps not worth seeing in IMAX, but The Grinch does provide some rich visuals that will also capture the eye of all moviegoers. The Grinch is holiday fun for the whole family, adapting a classic story with a new twist that makes for an altogether compelling moviegoing experience."

Sandie Angulo Chen of Common Sense Media gave the film 3/5 and stated, "This adaptation is bright, colorful, and occasionally funny, but it doesn't come close to matching the effectiveness of the short-and-sweet original." Amy West of Empire gave the film 3 out of 5 stars, writing "Despite its story-telling ambition being two sizes too small (much like its hairy protagonist’s heart), The Grinch is impossibly cute, visually rich and boasts enough festive fun to satisfy young viewers."

Accolades

See also
 List of Christmas films
 How the Grinch Stole Christmas (2000 film)

References

External links

 
 

2018 3D films
2018 animated films
2018 comedy films
2018 computer-animated films
2018 directorial debut films
2010s American animated films
2010s children's comedy films
2010s fantasy comedy films
American 3D films
American children's animated comedy films
American children's animated fantasy films
American Christmas comedy films
American computer-animated films
American fantasy comedy films
American children's animated musical films
Animated Christmas films
Animated films about orphans
Animated films based on children's books
2010s English-language films
Films based on works by Dr. Seuss
Films scored by Danny Elfman
IMAX films
Illumination (company) animated films
Universal Pictures animated films
Universal Pictures films
2010s Christmas films
2010s Christmas comedy films
The Grinch (franchise)
Films directed by Scott Mosier
Films directed by Yarrow Cheney
Films produced by Chris Meledandri
Films produced by Janet Healy
Films with screenplays by Tommy Swerdlow